Anita Hopper is an American molecular geneticist who is a professor at the Ohio State University. She studies the mechanisms of distribution of RNA between the nucleus and cytoplasm. She is a Fellow of the American Academy of Microbiology and the American Association for the Advancement of Science and was elected a Member of the National Academy of Sciences in 2021.

Early life and education 
Hopper was an undergraduate student at the University of Illinois at Chicago, where she studied biology. She moved to the University of Illinois Urbana-Champaign for her graduate studies, where she specialized in cell biology. Hopper studied the replication of satellite tobacco necrosis virus. After completing her doctoral research she moved to the University of Washington, where she spent four years as a postdoctoral research associate.

Research and career 
Hopper joined the faculty at the University of Massachusetts Medical School, and was promoted to associate professor. She was appointed professor at the Pennsylvania State University in 1979, where she spent almost thirty years before joining the Ohio State University as chair of the Department of Molecular Genetics.

Hopper makes use of Saccharomyces cerevisiae (yeast) as a model system to study processing and intracellular trafficking of tRNAs. Almost all RNAs involved in protein synthesis are generated in the nucleus but function in the cytoplasm (and vice versa). Hopper both processes occur along nuclear export pathways, where export quality is controlled by the translation machinery itself. She showed that tRNAs from the cytoplasm accumulate in the nucleus under particular stress conditions.

Hopper's area expertise include: intracellular trafficking of RNA and proteins, RNA processing and yeast genetics and genomics.

Awards and honors 
 1994 Elected Fellow of the American Academy of Microbiology
 2002 President of the RNA Society
 2008 Elected Fellow of the American Association for the Advancement of Science
 2009 RNA Society Lifetime Achievement Award in Service
 2012 Ohio State University Distinguished Scholar Award
 2015 RNA Society Lifetime Achievement in Science Award
 2017 Undergraduate Mortar Board/Sphinx Honor Society 
 2021 Elected Fellow of the National Academy of Sciences

Selected publications

Personal life 
Hopper was married to biochemist James Hopper, with whom she had one daughter.

References 

Ohio State University faculty
University of Illinois Chicago alumni
University of Illinois Urbana-Champaign alumni
Women geneticists
University of Massachusetts Medical School faculty
Pennsylvania State University faculty
Year of birth missing (living people)
Living people